An End to Killing, also known as Kingdom of Conquerors, is a 2013 film directed by Wang Ping. It tells that in the 1200s, a man arose whose ruthlessness was so feared, he emerged as the greatest empire builder ever known to mankind. Inspired by true historical events.

Cast
 Zhao Youliang as Master Qiu Chuji
 Park Ye Jin as Khulan
 Tu Men as Genghis Khan
 Elvis Tsui as Yelü Chucai (Long Beard)
 Geng Le as General Liu Zhonglu
 Li Xiaoran as Inn's Proprietress
 Yu Shaoqun as Disciple Zhao Dao'an

External links
 

2013 films
2010s historical films
Chinese historical films
Chinese-language films
Films set in the 13th century
Films set in China
Films set in the Mongol Empire
Depictions of Genghis Khan on film